State Council Research Office is the administrative office within the State Council of the People's Republic of China in charge of formulating policy, conducting research, policy recommendations and consultation on strategic, organizational, services related to the State Council. It aims to improve the functions and governance of the State Council.

The office was established in 1995. Its current director is Huang Shouhong.

Administrative Structure
The State Council Research Office is organised in the following departments:

Secretariat (Department of Personnel, Department of Foreign Affairs)
Department of General Research
Department of Macroeconomic Research
Department of Work Affairs and Business Research
Department of Rural Economy Research
Department of Social Development Research
Communist Party Committee Office

References

External links
State Council Official Website 

State Council of the People's Republic of China
1995 establishments in China
Think tanks based in China